Edward Ralph McLaughlin (born June 16, 1928) was an American politician in the state of South Dakota. He was a member of the South Dakota House of Representatives from 2000 to 2010. He worked as an insurance agent, academic administrator, and educator. He was also a member of the Rapid City Common Council.

References

1928 births
Living people
Republican Party members of the South Dakota House of Representatives
Politicians from Rapid City, South Dakota
People from Spearfish, South Dakota
South Dakota city council members